Tamia Monique Carter (born January 9, 2000), known professionally as Flo Milli, is an American rapper. She rose to prominence after her songs "Beef FloMix" and "In the Party" went viral on the social media platform TikTok, eventually leading them to be certified gold by the Recording Industry Association of America. Afterwards she signed a recording deal with Justin Goldman's '94 Sounds and RCA Records.

Flo Milli released her debut mixtape, Ho, Why Is You Here? (2020), to critical acclaim. The mixtape earned an entry on the Billboard 200, and was placed on the list of the '200 Greatest Hip Hop Albums of All Time' by Rolling Stone (2022). She was also nominated for Best New Artist at the 2020 BET Hip Hop Awards. In July 2022, she released her debut album  You Still Here, Ho?.

Early life
Tamia Monique Carter was born and raised in Mobile, Alabama. Her birthday is January 9, 2000.  She wrote her first song at 9 years old, and began rapping at age 11, forming rap group Real & Beautiful, later known as Pink Mafia, which she dissolved at age 14. After watching an episode of BET's music video countdown show 106 & Park that featured Nicki Minaj, she was inspired and began writing short verses that grew into songs. Speaking about her high school experience, she said, "I dealt with everything, so it just taught me that the only thing that matters is my opinion of myself." She released her first solo song, "No Hook", in 2015. She grew up listening to Jill Scott, Anthony Hamilton and Erykah Badu.

Career

2019–2021: Ho, Why Is You Here?
In October 2018, Flo Milli recorded the original version of her breakout single, "Beef FloMix", a freestyle over the instrumental of rapper and producer Ethereal's 2014 track "Beef" featuring rapper Playboi Carti. It went viral on Instagram and other social media sites, including TikTok, reaching number two on Spotify's Viral 50 in April 2019. A fully-produced version of the song was released in July 2019, and received over 46 million streams on Spotify. Flo Milli's follow-up single was "In the Party", released in October 2019. She performed at Rolling Loud Los Angeles in December 2019. By the end of 2019, she had signed to record executive Justin Goldman's label '94 Sounds and RCA Records. In February 2020, she released the single "My Attitude". Her singles "Not Friendly" and "Eat It Up" were released in March and April 2020 respectively. In June 2020, Flo Milli released the J. White Did It-produced single "Like That Bitch". A music video for the track was released in July 2020, alongside another single, "Weak". Flo Milli's debut mixtape, Ho, Why Is You Here?, was released on July 24, 2020, to critical praise.

On August 10, 2020, it was announced that Flo Milli had signed an exclusive global co-publishing deal with Pulse Music Group. The company described the deal, which encompasses her entire catalog, as "a highly competitive signing situation". Singer Saygrace featured Flo Milli on the remix of her single, "Boys Ain't Shit", in August 2020. She appeared in the music video for G-Eazy's single, "Down", featuring Latto, in September 2020. Flo Milli was nominated for Best New Artist at the 2020 BET Hip Hop Awards in September 2020.

In January 2021, Flo Milli released the single, "Roaring 20s". In June 2021, she was included on the XXL Freshman Class of 2021.  She was nominated for Best New Artist at the BET Awards 2021.

2022: You Still Here, Ho?
On July 20, 2022, she released her second studio album, You Still Here, Ho?

Public image 
Jon Caramanica of The New York Times described Flo Milli as a "clever, cheerful lyricist". Jessica McKinney of Complex wrote, "The Mobile, Alabama rapper's bubbly, intoxicating delivery defies regional sounds, making her a versatile artist whose music can travel well beyond her hometown. She's a star." Rapper ppcocaine cited Flo Milli as an influence on their music.

Discography

Studio albums

Mixtapes

Singles

As lead artist

As featured artist

Guest appearances

Awards and nominations

References

2000 births
Living people
21st-century American rappers
Rappers from Alabama
People from Mobile, Alabama
African-American women rappers
21st-century American women
21st-century African-American women
21st-century African-American musicians
20th-century African-American people
20th-century African-American women
Southern hip hop musicians
21st-century women rappers